The Dignity Party is an Egyptian left-wing Nasserist political party founded in 1996. The current leader of the party is Mohamed Samy.

In March 2016, the Popular Current Party merged into the Dignity Party.

References

External links
Facebook Page

1996 establishments in Egypt
Arab nationalism in Egypt
Egyptian democracy movements
Nasserist political parties
Nationalist parties in Egypt
Political parties established in 1996
Socialist parties in Egypt